The 127th Air Refueling Group is a unit of the Michigan Air National Guard, assigned to the 127th Wing, Selfridge Air National Guard Base, Michigan.

History
Established in 1962 when the Michigan ANG 171st Tactical Reconnaissance Squadron was expanded to a Group.  Was primarily a training unit flying second-line RF-84F Thundersteak reconnaissance aircraft for Tactical Air Command, upgrading to the newer RF-101 Voodoo in 1971.

Reassigned to Aerospace Defense Command (ADCOM) in 1973, equipped with F-106 Delta Dart interceptors.   Performed air defense duties of the Great Lakes and Detroit area until 1978 when ADCOM was merged into Tactical Air Command.   Continued air defense mission for ADTAC component of TAC with F-4 Phantom IIs, transferring to First Air Force when ADTAC was replaced in 1985.   Upgraded to F-16A Fighting Falcons in 1990.

Transferred to Air Mobility Command in 1993 when the group became a C-130 Hercules Tactical Airlift unit. Inactivated in April 1996 when the 127th Fighter Wing and 191st Airlift Group were merged due to the One-Base, One Wing policy.   Reactivated in May 1999 as a group under the 127th Wing, operating the C-130 airlift element of the composite wing.

Inactivated in September 2007 with the realignment of Selfridge and transfer of the C-130s and the transition to the KC-135 Stratotanker due to BRAC 2005.   The 191st Group was inactivated, however the 191st Operation Support Flight, 191st Maintenance Squadron, 191st Aircraft Maintenance Squadron, 191st Maintenance Operations Flight and the 171st Air Refueling Squadron were reassigned to the 127th Air Refueling Group, 127th Wing.

Lineage
 Established as the 191st Tactical Reconnaissance Group on 11 September 1962 and allotted to the Air National Guard
 Activated on 1 October 1962
 Redesignated 191st Fighter-Interceptor Group c. 21 July 1972
 Redesignated 191st Fighter Group on 15 March 1992
 Redesignated 191st Airlift Group on 15 July 1994
 Inactivated on 1 April 1996
 Activated on 1 May 1999
 Redesignated 127th Air Refueling Group, 30 September 2007,

Assignments
 127th Tactical Reconnaissance Wing, 1 October 1962
 835th Air Division, 1 July 1967
 127th Tactical Reconnaissance Wing, 1967
 102nd Fighter-Interceptor Wing, c. 21 Jul 1972  
 144th Fighter-Interceptor Wing
 127th Wing, 15 March 1992 – 1 April 1996
 127th Wing, 1 May 1999 – present
Michigan Air National Guard, 1 Oct 1962 – 1 April 1996

 Gained by Tactical Air Command, 1 October 1962
 Gained by Aerospace Defense Command, c. 21 July 1972
 Gained by Tactical Air Command, 1 June 1978
 Gained by Air Combat Command, 1 June 1992
 Gained by Air Mobility Command, 1 October 1993

Components
 171st Tactical Reconnaissance (later Fighter-Interceptor, later Tactical Fighter, Later Fighter, Later Airlift) Squadron, 1 October 1962 – 1 April 1996; 1 May 1999 – 30 September 2007

Stations
 Detroit Wayne County Metropolitan Airport, Michigan, 1 October 1962
 Selfridge Air Force Base (later Selfridge Air National Guard Base), Michigan, 1 July 1971 – 1 April 1996; 1 May 1999 – 30 September 2007

Aircraft
 RF-84F Thunderstreak, 1962–1971
 RF-101C Voodoo, 1971–1972
 F-106 Delta Dart, 1972–1978
 F-4C Phantom II, 1978–1986
 F-4D Phantom II, 1986–1990
 F-16A Fighting Falcon, 1990
 C-130 Hercules, 1993–1996; 1999–2007
 KC-135 Stratotanker, 2007–Present

References

Notes
 Explanatory notes

 Citations

Bibliography

191st Airlift Group Lineage and History
Rogers, B. (2006). United States Air Force Unit Designations Since 1978.

External links
127th Wing
Interview with a pilot who flew for the 171st

Groups of the United States Air National Guard
Military units and formations in Michigan
Air refueling groups of the United States Air Force